Penafiel is a town and municipality in northern Portugal. It may also refer to:

 the former Roman Catholic Diocese of Penafiel, with see and former cathedral in that town, now a Latin titular see
 Penafiel (parish), a civil parish in Penafiel Municipality, Portugal
 F.C. Penafiel, a football club based in the city of Penafiel, Portugal

See also 
 Peñafiel (disambiguation) (Spanish)